The 1999 Turkey earthquake may refer to:
 1999 İzmit earthquake, 7.6 magnitude quake on August 17
 1999 Düzce earthquake, 7.2 magnitude quake on November 12, 60 miles further east

See also
List of earthquakes in Turkey